Antony Tonks (born 27 April 1985) is an English rugby league footballer who plays as a  for the Dewsbury Rams in the Kingstone Press Championship.

Background
He was born in Normanton, West Yorkshire, England.

Playing career
He began his career playing for the Wakefield Trinity Academy team before signing for Bradford Bulls. Tonks spent a season at Oldham (Heritage № 1213), before signing for Featherstone Rovers after the National League Two Grand Final of 2008.

He has also represented Yorkshire Under-18s.

References

External links
 Tony Tonks Official Player Profile

1985 births
Living people
Bradford Bulls players
Dewsbury Rams players
Doncaster R.L.F.C. players
English rugby league players
Featherstone Rovers players
Halifax R.L.F.C. players
Huddersfield Giants players
Oldham R.L.F.C. players
Place of birth missing (living people)
Rugby league players from Wakefield
Rugby league props
Sheffield Eagles players
Sportspeople from Normanton, West Yorkshire